Cyrtocarenum cunicularium is a trapdoor spider species found in Greece, Crete, Rhodes and Turkey.

See also 
 List of Ctenizidae species

References

External links 

Ctenizidae
Spiders of Europe
Rhodes
Arthropods of Turkey
Spiders described in 1811